Feng Tao may refer to:

 Feng Dao (Feng Tao in Wade–Giles, 882–954), Chinese inventor, printer, and politician
 Franklin Feng Tao, Chinese-American chemical engineer
 Feng Tao (footballer) (born 1983), Chinese footballer